The 7th Battle Squadron was a squadron of the British Royal Navy assembled prior to World War I it was assigned to the Third Fleet and consisted of pre-dreadnought type battleships the oldest ships  in fleet it existed from 1912 to 1914.

History
The squadron was established on 2 July 1912 when Vice-Admiral Sir Henry Jackson assumed command.  His second in command Rear-Admiral Charles Dundas was also appointed. The squadron was attached to the Third Fleet. On 13 July 1914 Vice-Admiral Sir Alexander Bethell succeeded Vice-Admiral Sir Henry Jackson. On 8 August 1914 the 7th Battle Squadron was absorbed into the 8th Battle Squadron, which consisted of the oldest pre-dreadnought battleships of the Royal Navy.

Vice-Admirals commanding
Post holders included:

Rear-Admirals, Second in command
Post holders included:

Footnotes

References
 Harley, Simon; Lovell, Tony. "Seventh Battle Squadron (Royal Navy) - The Dreadnought Project". www.dreadnoughtproject.org. Harley & Lovell, 10 November 2016.
 Mackie, Colin. "Royal Navy Senior Appointments from 1865" (PDF). gulabin. Colin Mackie, December 2017.
 Smith, Gordon. "Royal Navy ship dispositions 1914-1918: THE GRAND FLEET, 1914-1916 by Admiral Viscount Jellicoe". www.naval-history.net. Gordon Smith, 6 January 2015.

External links
 Seventh Battle Squadron at DreadnoughtProject.org
Royal Navy History
Composition of the Grand Fleet

Battle squadrons of the Royal Navy
Ship squadrons of the Royal Navy in World War I
Military units and formations established in 1912
Military units and formations disestablished in 1914